Paidiscura is a genus of comb-footed spiders that was first described by Allan Frost Archer in 1950.

Species
 it contains four species, found in Asia, Africa, and Europe:
Paidiscura dromedaria (Simon, 1880) – Cape Verde Is., Spain, France, Italy, Greece, North Africa to Middle East
Paidiscura orotavensis (Schmidt, 1968) – Canary Is., Madeira
Paidiscura pallens (Blackwall, 1834) (type) – Europe, Algeria, Turkey, Georgia, Russia (Europe to South Siberia)
Paidiscura subpallens (Bösenberg & Strand, 1906) – China, Korea, Japan

Formerly included:
P. genistae (Simon, 1873) (Transferred to Theridion)
P. genistae (Charitonov, 1946) (Transferred to Theridion)
P. musiva (Simon, 1873) (Transferred to Ruborridion)
P. pinicola (Simon, 1873) (Transferred to Theridion)

In synonymy:
P. bigibba (O. Pickard-Cambridge, 1912) = Paidiscura dromedaria (Simon, 1880)
P. caboverdensis (Schmidt & Piepho, 1994) = Paidiscura dromedaria (Simon, 1880)
P. caninotata (Bösenberg & Strand, 1906) = Paidiscura subpallens (Bösenberg & Strand, 1906)
P. mirabilis (Zhu, Zhang & Xu, 1991) = Paidiscura subpallens (Bösenberg & Strand, 1906)
P. palustre ) = Paidiscura dromedaria (Simon, 1880)

See also
 List of Theridiidae species

References

Further reading

Araneomorphae genera
Spiders of Africa
Spiders of Asia
Theridiidae